The 2021–22 Nicholls Colonels men's basketball team represented Nicholls State University in the 2021–22 NCAA Division I men's basketball season. The Colonels, led by fourth-year head coach Austin Claunch, played their home games at Stopher Gymnasium in Thibodaux, Louisiana as members of the Southland Conference. They finished the season 21–12, 11–3 in Southland Play to finish as regular season champions. They lost in the semifinals of the Southland tournament to Texas A&M Corpus-Christi. As a No. 1 seed who didn’t win their conference tournament, they received an automatic bid to the National Invitation Tournament where they lost in the first round to SMU.

Previous season
The Colonels finished the 2020–21 season 18–7, 14–2 in Southland play to finish as Southland regular season champions. In the Southland tournament, they defeated Northwestern State in the semifinals, before falling to Abilene Christian in the championship game.

Roster

Schedule and results

|-
!colspan=12 style=| Exhibition

|-
!colspan=12 style=| Non-conference regular season

|-
!colspan=12 style=| Southland regular season

|-
!colspan=9 style=| Southland tournament

|-
!colspan=9 style=| NIT

Source

References

Nicholls Colonels men's basketball seasons
Nicholls Colonels
Nicholls Colonels men's basketball
Nicholls Colonels men's basketball
Nicholls